Topple is a board game published in 1983 by Waddingtons.

Contents
Topple is a game in which players play pieces of their color on various parts of the podium to score points without causing a topple.

Reception
Brian Walker reviewed Topple for Games International magazine, and gave it 4 stars out of 5, and stated that "Like darts and snooker, dexterity is considerably enhanced by a few jars of one's favourite beverage. So there you have it, Topple – the idea game after a tipple."

Reviews
Jeux & Stratégie #27

References

Board games introduced in 1983